Oxymacaria temeraria is a moth of the family Geometridae first described by Swinhoe in 1891. It is found in the Indian region, western China, Taiwan, Japan, Borneo and Java.

The wingspan is 29–34 mm. It is a variable greyish-brown species with a white ground colour that is most prominent in the submarginal area of both wings.

References

Moths described in 1891
Macariini
Moths of Japan